Manal Benchlikha (born 18 September 1993), better known by her first name Manal, is a Moroccan pop singer-songwriter.

Biography 

Originally from Kalaat Sraghna, Manal grew up in Marrakesh where she studied business and finance. Having always wanted to be a musical artist, she posted covers on YouTube and was discovered by Hamza Ait Khali, the partner of Moroccan producer DJ Van.

After a short stint with DJ Van's label Magic Castle Entertainment and the release of her debut single Denia, which earned her the 'Best Female Artist in Northern Africa' award at the Africa Music Awards in 2015, she switched management to Tarik Azzougarh, better known as Cilvaringz, producer and conceptualizer of the world's most expensive musical work ever sold, Wu-Tang Clan's Once Upon A Time in Shaolin.

Manal followed up her debut single with her song Koulchi Ban, the last song she would do with DJ Van. The release of Koulchi Ban received critical acclaim from fans and sparked the interest of Sony Music Middle East. In October 2017, Manal became one of the first Moroccan artists to sign to a major label in the Arab world.

In February 2018, Manal released her third single Taj (Crown). Due to its music video and a significant departure from Manal's signature sound, Taj started a buzz and garnered millions of views quickly. It is one of the most viewed Arabic rap songs performed by a female artist. After Taj, Manal released the song Nah featuring Moroccan rap duo Shayfeen and then had one of her biggest singles to date, Slay, in collaboration with ElGrandeToto.

In November 2019, Manal signed a distribution deal with RCA Records, a division of Sony Music France, through her record company Bench & Guess Entertainment. 

Currently, she is under an exclusive license agreement with the same label, and under a music publishing agreement with Universal Music Publishing.

Manal's current management team includes Anissa Jalab, former manager of Belgian rapper Damso, head of Wagram Belgium, and also manager of ElGrandeToto.

In May 2021, Manal released her first album entitled 360, which included the hit single Niya.

Deprived of the stage during the COVID-19 pandemic, she launched, with the help of her husband Moncef Guessous, a streetwear brand called Bari & Soch.

In November 2021, Manal earned the 'Best Female Artist in Northern Africa' award at the 2021 All Africa Music Awards for the second time in her career.

In May 2022, Manal performed "3ARI" for COLORS. In October 2022, she was chosen to feature in Light The Sky, a song for the 2022 FIFA World Cup in Qatar, collaborating with artists, RedOne, Balqees, Rahma Riad and Nora Fatehi.

Discography

Albums

Singles

Other appearances

References

External links 
 

1993 births
21st-century Moroccan women singers
Moroccan pop singers
Living people
Fifa World Cup ceremonies performers